White Hair (Pawhuska) is the English name of several Osage leaders in the eighteenth and nineteenth century. A tintype image of White Hair can be seen at the Osage Nation Museum in Pawhuska, Oklahoma.

White Hair I

The first White Hair, Paw-Hiu-Skah, Pahuska, or Pawhuska, was born about 1763 and died about 1809.  The town of Pawhuska, Oklahoma is named for him.   He was the chief of the Thorny-Valley people, a division of the Osage people.  In 1791, Pawhuska is reputed to have fought against American troops under Arthur St. Clair in Ohio.  During the battle, the worst defeat ever suffered by U.S. forces against Indians, Pawhuska attempted to scalp a fallen officer but the man's powdered wig came off in Pawhuska's hand. In the ensuing confusion, the officer escaped. The chief was impressed by how the wig protected its original wearer, so he kept it for the rest of his life and became known as White Hair.

In the late eighteenth century the Osage were a powerful tribe on the Western prairies with an empire that reached south from the Missouri River to the Red River.  Pawhuska was the most prominent chief and had the closest relationships with French traders, especially the powerful Chouteau family which operated under the rule of the Spanish government.  The Osage frequently had skirmishes and battles with the Spanish and other Indian tribes.  However, internal dissension weakened the Osage as they split into three main groups. 
In 1796, the group headed by Clermont (Claremore) and  Pawhuska settled near Jean Pierre Chouteau's trading post on the Verdigris River in Indian Territory

In 1800, the Marqués de Casa Calvo, newly appointed governor of Louisiana accused Osages of stealing from and murdering non-Natives and encouraged Pawhuska and his band of Osages to fight the rest of the Osages. Pawhuska refused.

One of Pawhuska's daughters married Kaw chief White Plume and thus established a lasting peace between the Osage and Kaw.  White Plume's great-grandson was Charles Curtis, vice president of the United States, and many present-day Kaw Indians can trace their ancestry back to White Plume and Pawhuska.

White Hair II through VI

The lineage of Pawhuska continued with his son, White Hair II, but he apparently was an ineffective chief and he was soon replaced by White Hair III, who moved most of the remaining members of the Osage tribe to the Neosho River in Oklahoma in 1822.  The Osage subsequently were forced by White and Indian encroachment on their lands to move back to a small reservation in Kansas. White Hair IV (George White Hair) became chief in 1832 and served until his death in 1852, age 48.  His cousin Iron Hawk became White Hair V until his death in 1861, also 48 years old.  Little White Hair became the last hereditary White Hair Chief, serving until his death on December 24, 1869.  White Hair VI was one of the signers of the 1865 treaty that ceded most Osage lands in Kansas to the United States and set the stage for their removal to a reservation (contiguous with Osage County) in Oklahoma in 1871.  By this time the powerful Osage of the eighteenth and early nineteenth century were a beleaguered people, but in one sense they had the last laugh.  They sold their old lands for a good price and huge pools of petroleum were found on their new lands in Oklahoma.

Notes

References
DuVal, Kathleen. The native ground: Indians and colonists in the heart of the continent. Philadelphia: University of Pennsylvania Press, 2006. .

Native American leaders
Osage people
18th-century Native Americans